Baiyun District is one of 11 urban districts of the prefecture-level city of Guangzhou, the capital of Guangdong Province, China. The district is located in the city's northern suburbs, and is named after the Baiyun Mountain (the "White Cloud Mountain"), one of the area's natural attractions.

Administrative divisions
There are currently 18 subdistricts and 4 towns.

On 19 December 2013 four new subdistricts (Yuncheng, Helong, Baiyunhu, & Shimen) were established from carving out of existing subdistricts.

History
Nowadays Baiyun District was originally governed by Panyu County (now Panyu District) and Nanhai County (now Nanhai District). However, since 1924, the district changed its name as new suburb of Guangzhou (Canton) city. in June 1954, Baiyun District was formally established.

Economy

For many years, Guangzhou's main airport, the (Former) Guangzhou Baiyun International Airport was located within Baiyun District. In 2004, the airport was relocated farther north from the city center.  Although the new airport has retained the name Guangzhou Baiyun International Airport, most of it is actually located in the neighboring Huadu District, just north of its border with the Baiyun District.

China Southern Airlines is headquartered in the Baiyun District.

9Air is headquartered in Xicheng Village, Renhe Town (人和镇), Baiyun District.

Transportation

Metro
Baiyun is currently service by six metro lines operated by Guangzhou Metro:

 - Jiahewanggang, Huangbian, Jiangxia, Xiao-gang, Baiyun Culture Square, Baiyun Park, Feixiang Park, Sanyuanli
 - Gaozeng, Renhe, Longgui, Jiahewanggang, Baiyundadaobei, Yongtai, Tonghe, Jingxi Nanfang Hospital, Meihuayuan
 - Xunfenggang, Hengsha, Shabei
 - Jiaoxin, Tinggang, Shijing, Xiaoping, Julong, Shangbu, Tongde, Ezhangtan
 - Gaozeng
 - ,,,,,

Government and infrastructure
Guangdong Prison Administrative Bureau is headquartered in the district.

Education
International schools in Baiyun District:
 École Française Internationale de Canton (French school)
 British School of Guangzhou
 Alcanta International College
 The original campus of Guangzhou Nanhu International School (now (Guangzhou Nanfang International School)

References

External links

Official website of Baiyun District government

 
Districts of Guangzhou